Leif Strömberg (born January 4, 1962, in Stockholm) is a Swedish ice hockey coach and former ice hockey player (forward and defence). Within Swedish hockey, he is regarded as an unconventional coach and a colorful character. Besides having coached a long list of Swedish teams he has an international coaching career. His latest international job was as head coach for German Krefeld Pinguine in 2022. Strömberg has often also worked as general manager for the clubs he has been the head coach for.

Playing career
Leif Strömberg, nicknamed "Strumpan" = "The Sock", started his professional career in Hammarby IF's J18- and J20-teams, went on to Djurgårdens IF J20-team, and then back again to Hammarby. Following this, he had a long career away from Stockholm in several different teams in the Swedish Hockeyettan and Hockeytvåan leagues, and finally ended his career back in Stockholm again with Mälarhöjden/Bredäng Hockey / MB Hockey.

Coaching career
Strömberg started as a coach in 1993 for IK Göta, the same year he ended his career as a professional player. He's worked as a coach all over Sweden, the longest stint being in Karlskoga for Bofors IK. In 2017 he began his international career as head coach for Norwegian Stjernen Hockey, and has worked as head coach in Romania and Germany too.

Personal life
Tragedy struck Strömberg early in his coaching career as he lost his fiancé Karin to cancer on January 19, 2000. Working both as head coach and general manager for Bofors IK he was left alone with their young daughter Sofia.

Besides his career as a professional player and coach, Strömberg has been an expert TV commentator for several Swedish channels.

References

External links

1962 births
Living people
Ice hockey people from Stockholm
Swedish ice hockey defencemen
Swedish ice hockey right wingers
Swedish ice hockey coaches
Swedish ice hockey forwards
Swedish expatriate ice hockey people in Norway
Swedish expatriate ice hockey people in Romania
Swedish expatriate ice hockey people in Germany
Djurgårdens IF Hockey players
Tingsryds AIF players
Hammarby Hockey (1921–2008) players
Tyringe SoSS players
Olofströms IK players
Nybro Vikings players
Nyköpings Hockey players
IK Göta Ishockey players
20th-century Swedish people
21st-century Swedish people